2021 Gator Bowl may refer to:

 2021 Gator Bowl (January), played as part of the 2020–21 college football bowl season between Kentucky and NC State on January 2, 2021
 2021 Gator Bowl (December), scheduled as part of the 2021–22 college football bowl season between Wake Forest and Rutgers on December 31, 2021